Magana Jari Ce  meaning Speaking is profitable or it literally means Wisdom is an asset or "ability to tell stories is a valuable possession" as described by Rupert East, the book is a novel which is considered to be one of the greatest books to have ever been written in Hausa Language across Northern Nigeria. The book is officially recognised in Nigerian Secondary Schools for Hausa subjects and curriculum, The book was written by Abubakar Imam, a prominent author from Northern Nigeria Protectorate. The first edition was first published in 1937 by Northern Nigerian Publishing Company Limited and other parts of the books by Zaria Corporation.

History 
Magana Jari Ce part 1 was first published in 1937 by Northern Nigerian Publishing Company, while the second and the third version in different years by Zaria Coparation.

The book was written as a result of Abubakar Imam participatory in a writing contest organised by Rupert East in 1933, which was won by Abubakar Imam with his first debut novel known as Ruwan Bagaja, during six months duration of his living in Zaria, he wrote Magana Jari Ce as his second novel, which was first published in 1937, followed by part 2 and part 3 in different years.

Publication 
The book is published in three version, Magana Jari Ce 1, 2 and 3, each version was published in a different year.

Plot 
The novel tells a story of a young prince and his parrot pet known as Aku. It also depicts royalist and royal life within Hausa emirates, where royalist struggle for royal title inheritance, which makes them optimistic to make plans to inherit imperial, royal and noble ranks. The story begins with a story of a rich emir who has a kingdom but unfortunately doesn't have a child that will inherit his wealth and become the future king. Fortunately for the emir, a traditional sheikh dreams that if the emir will gather together 40 imams to pray for him for about 40 days, God will answer their prayers and bless him with a child. The result was the birth of Musa, the young crown prince and heir to the throne.  At about 12 years of age, an emir from Sinari kingdom send his visier to Emir Abdurahman, the father of Musa, proposing a marriage engagement between his daughter Princess Sinaratu and Prince Musa.  This is the marriage proposal that upset Sarki Abdurahman, which makes him disgraced the visier of Sinari by telling him unpleasant statement and send him out of his kingdom disgraced.

Upon what happened the visier to Sarki Abdurahman tends to join hand with Sarkin Sinari to fight his own emir in return of a throne, he sent his slave to direct them into the kingdom by following unknown route to come inside the kingdom and overthrow the emir.  The plan was unsuccessful and Emir Abdurahman wished to retaliate. As Sarki Abdulrahman must leave to go to war, he left his visier on the throne to rule over the kingdom, not knowing that his visier is a traitor to the kingdom.

Upon his leaving, the visier decided to kill the crown prince and, hoping for the emir to die in war, would make him the righteous heir to the throne. Crown prince Musa's father left the palace to fight, having ordered his most trusted slaves to protect his son against any internal traitor who might harm the prince. 

The crown prince's pet parrot, Aku, has knowledge of the past, present and future, so the parrot entertains the prince with stories, so that he does not leave the palace in pursuit of his father and expose himself to danger.

Characters 
The characters include

 Sarki Abdurahman the royal Emir, father of the crown prince Musa and grandfather to Mahamudu.
Waziri the visier to Sarki Abdurahman who couch allegiance to Sarkin Zinari to invent the kingdom in return of making him the crown emir.
Musa the crown prince, son of Sarki Abdurahman.
Mahamudu the son of the daughter of Sarki Abdurahman, and a childhood friend of Crown Prince Musa, also son to the 70-year-old commander of the kingdom.  As a small boy, to inherit the position of his father, he would have to fight side by side with Emir in war.
Waziri Aku which means parrot, is a pet of the crown prince Musa, who later became the visier to the royal Emir. He is the storyteller to the young crown prince to take away his curious emotional feelings and to deviate the crown prince from leaving the palace to follow his father into battle, which the visier would like to take advantage of killing the crown prince outside the palace.
Sarkin Zinari, Abdulaziz dan Shehu Mukhtar, the rival emir to Sarki Abdurahman, who was upset as a result of declining his wedding proposal to Musa son of Sarki Abdurahman and for disgracing his visier whom he sent for the proposal.
Sinaratu daughter to the Emir Sarkin Zinari, who he wants to marry prince Musa.
Wazirin Sinari the visier to Sarkin Zinari, He was disgraced by Sarki Abdurahman when he was sent with marriage proposal. He remained loyal to his emir unlike the visier of Sarki Abdurahman.

See also 

 Abubakar Imam
Ruwan Bagaja
 Northern Nigerian Publishing Company Limited
 Hausa language

Bibliography 
Furniss, Graham (1996). Poetry, prose and popular culture in Hausa. International African Institute. Edinburgh: Edinburgh University Press for the International African Institute. 
Muhammad, Abdulwahab (2015). A Semantic Analysis of Lexical Devices in Abubakar Imam Magana Jari Ce (1. Aufl ed.). Saarbrücken. .

References

External links 

 www.worldcat.org Magana Jari Ce

African Writers Series
Historical novels
Novels set in Nigeria
1937 debut novels
Novels by Abubakar Imam
1937 Nigerian novels